Temple of the White Elephant, also known as Sandok, il Maciste della Giungla, is a 1964 film directed by Umberto Lenzi and starring Sean Flynn.

Plot
In British colonial India, Lt. Dick Ramsay is charged with secretly rescuing the kidnapped daughter of the British viceroy of India and her fiancée, a fellow British officer from a cult of murderers who worship a white elephant. While on his mission he meets Princess Dhara and her man servant and protector, Parvati Sandok. Princess Dhara's brother has also been taken captive by the Cult of the White Elephant. Princess Dhara and Parvati Sandok aid Lt. Ramsay in his mission to free the captives and put an end to the cult's reign of terror.

Cast
Sean Flynn as Lt. Dick Ramsay
Marie Versini as Princess Dhara
Alessandra Panaro as Cynthia, the viceroy's daughter
Giacomo Rossi Stuart as Lt. Reginald Milliner, Cynthia's fiancée
Mimmo Palmara as Parvati Sandok

Production
Filmed on location in what was then known as Ceylon, (now known as Sri Lanka). The film was a French/Italian co-production. Sean dubbed his own dialog in the English language prints. In the English language prints Alessandra Panaro's character is known as Cynthia Montague. In the Italian, Spanish and French prints she is known as Cynthia Patterson.

External links

Article on film at Cinema Retro

1964 films
Italian adventure drama films
French adventure drama films
1960s Italian-language films
Films directed by Umberto Lenzi
1960s English-language films
1960s Italian films
1960s French films